Masashi Kita  is a Japanese mixed martial artist. He competed in the Middleweight division.

Mixed martial arts record

|-
| Loss
| align=center| 1-3
| Masato Nishiguchi
| Decision (unanimous)
| Shooto: Gig West 4
| 
| align=center| 2
| align=center| 5:00
| Osaka, Japan
| 
|-
| Loss
| align=center| 1-2
| Jun Kitagawa
| Decision (unanimous)
| Shooto: Gig West 1
| 
| align=center| 2
| align=center| 5:00
| Osaka, Japan
| 
|-
| Win
| align=center| 1-1
| Ryota Ibaraki
| Submission (armbar)
| Shooto: R.E.A.D. 3
| 
| align=center| 1
| align=center| 4:03
| Kadoma, Osaka, Japan
| 
|-
| Loss
| align=center| 0-1
| Ryuta Sakurai
| TKO (punches)
| Shooto: Shooter's Dream
| 
| align=center| 1
| align=center| 3:00
| Setagaya, Tokyo, Japan
|

See also
List of male mixed martial artists

References

Japanese male mixed martial artists
Middleweight mixed martial artists
Living people
Year of birth missing (living people)